The 1948–49 season was Newport County's second consecutive season in the Third Division South since relegation from the Second Division at the end of the 1946–47 season. It was the club's 20th season in the third tier and 21st season overall in the Football League.

Season review

Results summary

Results by round

Fixtures and results

Third Division South

FA Cup

Welsh Cup

League table

External links
 Newport County 1948-1949 : Results
 Newport County football club match record: 1949
 Welsh Cup 1948/49

References

 Amber in the Blood: A History of Newport County. 

1948-49
English football clubs 1948–49 season
1948–49 in Welsh football